Carboxydothermus islandicus is a thermophilic and anaerobic bacterium from the genus of Carboxydothermus which has been isolated from a hot spring on Iceland.

References

 

Peptococcaceae
Bacteria described in 2011
Thermophiles